The 2018–19 Brown Bears women's basketball team represented Brown University during the 2018–19 NCAA Division I women's basketball season. The Bears, led by fifth year head coach Sarah Behn, played their home games at the Pizzitola Sports Center and were members of the Ivy League. They finished the season at 9–21, 1–13 to finish in a last place. They failed to qualify for the Ivy League women's tournament.

Roster

Schedule

|-
!colspan=9 style=| Non-conference regular season

|-
!colspan=9 style=| Ivy League regular season

See also
 2018–19 Brown Bears men's basketball team

References

Brown Bears women's basketball seasons
Brown
Brown
Brown